Evelia is a feminine given name. Notable people with the name include:

 Evelia Farina (born 1941), Argentine sprinter
 María Evelia Marmolejo (born 1958), Colombian radical feminist performance artist
 Evelia Edith Oyhenart (1955-2021), Argentine anthropologist
 Evelia Sandoval Urbán (born 1964), Mexican politician

Feminine given names